Tut Tut, Now Shake Ya Butt is a studio album by American experimental punk band Japanther. The song "Radical Businessman" was used in Grand Theft Auto: The Lost and Damned, the add-on to the video game Grand Theft Auto IV. The album includes spoken word contributions from former Crass drummer Penny Rimbaud.

Track listing
 "Intro" – 0:51
 "Um Like Your Smile Is Totally Ruling Me" – 2:10
 "Bumpin' Rap Tapes" – 2:05
 "Bloated Corpse" – 2:09
 "Africa Seems So Far Away" – 10:53
 "The Dirge" – 2:43
 "The Windex" – 1:27
 "I the Indigene" – 9:18
 "Radical Businessman" – 2:22
 "Before the Sun Goes Down" – 2:07
 "Outro" – 0:55

References 

2009 albums
Japanther albums